The British Football Club was a Mexican football club that played in the Liga Mexicana de Football Amateur Association, the first Mexican league prior to the professionalization and development of the Primera División de México.

History
The club was founded in 1902 by Percy Clifford, a Cornish immigrant, who at the time was a member of the Club Reforma.

Clifford decided to dedicate his life to becoming one of the best players in the Mexican league and would later go on to become a Manager and board member for the club. The club's main source of economic support came from the Club Británico, a British sports club in Mexico City, which was founded in 1899. The team played its home games in the Club Británico's multifunction park which was directly in front of its headquarters.

The club sometimes traded players with the Reforma Athletic Club a day before a match in order to fill each club's rosters.  Clifford had been involved in the establishment of the Reforma Athletic Club football team in 1902. The two clubs were linked in this way because both had British roots.

The team became known for wearing smart, elegant uniforms claiming that sport and good taste were not contradictory, and were even an indication of gentlemanly good sportsmanship. At half time the teams would sit and drink tea at tables that had been set at the sidelines and were attended by beautiful women.

1907–1908
In the 1907–08 tournament, Puebla A.C. withdrew from the Primera Fuerza due to the long distances they would have had to travel, and defending champions Reforma AC were ranked last, failing to win any games. It was the first Mexican championship title for British Football Club (Mexico City), whose players were almost exclusively British. The player-trainer Percy Clifford, centre half-back "Jack" Caldwall and the Hogg brothers were the most prominent characters.

Honors

 Liga Mexicana de Football Amateur Association (1): 
 Champions (1): 1907–08
 Runners-up (3): 1904–05

Other
Tower Cup (1): 1910–11

Top Scorers
1904–05    Percy Clifford (5 Goals / 8 games)
1906–07    Percy Clifford (5 Goals / 8 games)
1907–08    John Hogg (4 Goals / 6 games)
1911–12    John Hogg (3 Goals / 4 games)

See also
Football in Mexico

References

Defunct football clubs in Mexico City
Association football clubs established in 1902
Association football clubs disestablished in 1912
1902 establishments in Mexico
1912 disestablishments in Mexico
British diaspora in North America
British association football clubs outside the United Kingdom
Primera Fuerza teams